Chakri Rajgan is a village in union council UC-2 Nakka Khurd of Jhelum District in the Punjab Province of Pakistan. It is part of Jhelum Tehsil.

References

Populated places in Jhelum District